Harold Lang (1923 – 16 November 1970) was a RADA-trained British character actor of stage and screen. During the 1950s, in particular, played many sly or menacing roles in B-films. 
At one time he managed his own theatrical company. From 1960, Lang, a devotee of Stanislavski, also taught acting at Central School of Speech and Drama; and director John Schlesinger filmed his work in a documentary, The Class, for BBC TV's Monitor, in 1961.

Partial filmography

 The Man from Morocco (1945) – Soldier (uncredited)
 Floodtide (1949) – Mac – the draughtsman (uncredited)
 The Spider and the Fly (1949) – Belfort – The Pickpocket
 Cairo Road (1950) – Humble
 The Franchise Affair (1951) – Bus inspector
 Calling Bulldog Drummond (1951) – Stan (uncredited)
 Cloudburst (1951) – Mickie Fraser / Kid Python
 Wings of Danger (1952) – Snell, the blackmailer
 So Little Time (1952) – Lt. Seger
 It Started in Paradise (1952) – Mr. Louis
 Folly to Be Wise (1952) – Soldier in Pub (uncredited)
 The Long Memory (1953) – Boyd's Chauffeur
 The Story of Gilbert and Sullivan (1953) – Singer
 Street Corner (1953) – Len
 Laughing Anne (1953) – Jacques
 The Saint's Return (1953) – Jarvis
 The Intruder (1953) – Bill
 A Day to Remember (1953) – Stan's Accomplice (uncredited)
 36 Hours (1953) – Harry Cross, desk clerk
 Star of My Night (1954) – Carl
 Murder by Proxy (1954) – Travis/Victor Vanno
 Dance, Little Lady (1954) – Mr. Bridson
 The Passing Stranger (1954) – Spicer
 The Men of Sherwood Forest (1954) – Hubert
 Adventure in the Hopfields (1954) – Sam Hines
 The Men of Sherwood Forest (1954) – Hubert
 The Quatermass Xperiment (1955) – Christie
 It's a Wonderful World (1956) – Mervyn Wade
 The Flesh Is Weak (1957) – Henry
 The Betrayal (1957) – Clay
 Carve Her Name with Pride (1958) – Commandant Suhren
 Man with the Gun (1958) – John Drayson
 Chain of Events (1958) – Jimmy Boy
 Links of Justice (1958) – (uncredited)
 Paranoiac (1963) – RAF Type
 West 11 (1963) – Silent
 Dr. Terror's House of Horrors (1965) – Roy Shine (segment "Voodoo") (uncredited)
 The Psychopath (1966) – Briggs
 The Baron (1967) – (episode "Countdown")
 Two Gentlemen Sharing (1969) – Camp Neighbour (final film role)

Other works

(21 July 1947) He acted in the musical, "Best Foot Forward," at the Ogunquit Playhouse in Ogunquit, Maine with Edith Fellows, Alice Pearce, Hugh Martin, Michael Hall and Beverly Janis in the cast. John Cecil Holm wrote the book. Hugh Martin and Ralph Blane wrote the music and lyrics.

(1952) He acted in Jean Anouilh's play, "Thieves' Carnival", at the Arts Theatre Club in London, England with John Laurie, Robin Bailey, Wyndham Goldie, Judith Furse, Maxine Audley, David Bird, Gerald Harper and Tutte Lemkow in the cast. Roy Rich was the director. John Hotchkis was the musical director.

(1955) He acted in Marcelle Maurette's stage adaptation and translation of Émile Zola's novel, "Therese Raquin", to the stage as "The Lovers", at the Opera House in Manchester, England with Eva Bartok, Sam Wanamaker, Helen Haye, Kynaston Reeves and Peter Copley in the cast. Sam Wanamaker was also the director.

(November 1955 – December 1955) He played Edmund and Borachio respectively, in William Shakespeare's plays, "King Lear" and "Much Ado About Nothing", at the Shakespeare Memorial Theatre in Stratford, England, and on a UK and European tour; with John Gielgud, Peggy Ashcroft, Moira Lister, Helen Cherry, Anthony Nicholls, George Devine, Raymond Westwell, David O'Brien and Richard Easton in the cast. George Devine and John Gielgud were the directors. Isamu Noguchi and Mariano Andreu were the designers. Roberto Gerhard and Leslie Bridgewater were the musical directors.

(1958) He acted in Bernard Kops' play, "The Hamlet of Stepney Green", at the Lyric Theatre in Hammersmith, London, England with John Fraser, Thelma Ruby, John Barrard and George Selway in the cast.

(1959) He acted in Georg Büchner's play, "Danton's Death", at the Lyric Opera House in Hammersmith, London, England in a 59 Theatre Company production with Patrick McGoohan, Patrick Wymark, James Maxwell, John Turner, Fulton Mackay, Peter Sallis, Lee Fox, Maxwell Shaw, Dilys Hamlett, Avril Elgar and June Bailey in the cast. Caspar Wrede was the director.

(March 1959) He acted in Thomas Otway's translation of Molière's play, The Cheats of Scapin, at the Lyric Theatre in Hammersmith, London, England with Maxwell Shaw, Peter Sallis OBE, Patrick Wymark, Fulton Mackay and Helen Montagu in the cast. Peter Dews was the director.

(1959) He acted in Michael Meyer's translation of Henrik Ibsen's play, "Brand", at the Lyric Theatre in Hammersmith, London, England with the 59 Theatre Company featuring Patrick McGoohan, Dilys Hamlett, Patrick Wymark, Fulton Mackay, Peter Sallis OBE, Frank Windsor and June Bailey in the cast. Michael Elliott was the director.

(1965) He directed William Shakespeare's play, "As You Like It", at the Open Air Theatre in Regents Park, London, England with Ann Morrish, Gary Raymond, Phyllida Law, Edward Atienza, John Justin, Andrew Downie and Alfred Burke in the cast. The crew included Peter Rice (designer) and Elisabeth Lutyens (music).

References

External links

1922 births
1970 deaths
Male actors from London
British male stage actors
British male film actors
British male television actors
20th-century British male actors
Alumni of RADA
Acting teachers